Gouda is a style of Dutch pottery named after the city of Gouda, where it was historically manufactured. Gouda pottery gained worldwide prominence in the early 20th century and remains highly desirable to collectors today.

Gouda pottery is diverse and visually distinctive in appearance, typically illustrated with colourful and highly decorated Art Nouveau or Art Deco designs.

External links

 https://www.kovels.com/price-guide/pottery-porcelain-price-guide/gouda.html

Dutch pottery
Gouda, South Holland
Art Deco
Art Nouveau